The New Zealand Scout Jamboree is a Jamboree which is held every three years by Scouts New Zealand. The Jamboree is traditionally held in summer between late December and early January, with a significant New Years party. The 22nd New Zealand Scout Jamboree was held at Mystery Creek Events Centre, Hamilton in the North Island from 28 December 2019 to 7 January 2020.

History
The first NZ Scout jamboree was held in Dunedin in 1926. In recent years Jamborees have been held every three years.

The list supplied from Paul van Herpt, National Scout Museum Adviser, is as follows

 1926 - Dominion Jamboree Dunedin
 1959 - Pan Pacific Jamboree Cornwall Park, Auckland
 1962 - First class Jamboree, Waiora, Dunedin
 1966 - Progress Jamboree, Trentham, Wellington
 1969 - National Jamboree,  Blue Skies, Kaiapoi
 1972 - National Jamboree, Pukekohe, Auckland
 1975 - National Jamboree, Tokoroa
 1978 - 8th NZ Jamboree, Oamaru, 3rd Asia Pacific
 1981 - NZ Jamboree, Venture, Regatta, Hawkes Bay
 1984 - Feilding
 1987 - Rangiora
 1990 - 12th New Zealand, 11th Asia Pacific, Mystery Creek, Hamilton
 1993 - Upper Hutt
 1996 - Te Anau
 1999 - Greytown
 2001/02 -  Hamilton
 2004/05 - Feilding
 2007/08 -  C-JAM, Christchurch
 2010/11 - Adventure Jam 2011, Mystery Creek, Hamilton
2013/14 - NZ20, Manfeild Park, Feilding
2016/17 - Renwick Domain, Marlborough
2019/20 - Mystery Creek, Hamilton

Note: The 1939 Jamboree was cancelled due to the outbreak of war, details below
 1939 - International Jamboree, Heretaunga, near Wellington

Prior to update, the list included a reference to a Jamboree in 1942, as labelled on the www.teara.govt.nz website; it was in fact a rally, of which there were many.

 1942 - Scout Rally in Wellington

22nd New Zealand Scout Jamboree

The 22nd New Zealand Scout Jamboree was held at Mystery Creek Events Centre, Hamilton in the North Island. It ran from 28 December 2019 to 7 January 2020
This Jamboree, unlike earlier ones, has 1 central command centre (known as the hub), with 4 villages surrounding. Villages used to be known as subcamps. Within these villages, there will be a "Village Green" - A  central area to meet with other scouts, trade badges and more. The Jamboree hub is located at the central pavilion. At the hub, you can pay for gas, retrieve birthday cakes, purchase ice, or locate lost items. There is also a charging space and merchandise shop present.
Villages were named after lakes which connect with Mystery Creek. These are Maraetai, Arapuni, Waipapa and Ohakuri.

This Jamboree also changed the patrol system to the "Teams system". Each team consists of a Team Leader, Assistant Team Leader, and team members. There are 6 teams in a troop, similar to previous Jamborees, with 6 patrols to a troop. Each night at Jamboree, each troop has a Team Leader's Council, where each Team Leader decides what they want their Team to do the next day. The Duty Team Leader attends the Jamboree Team Council, with all other Duty Team Leaders that day. This has been promoted due to the new Scouts NZ policy, "Youth leading, Adults Supporting".
 
Some programme activity themes included; Survival; Water; Challenge; Adventure; Lake Karapiro (Overnight base).

21st New Zealand Scout Jamboree

The 21st New Zealand Scout Jamboree was held at Renwick Domain, Marlborough in the South Island from 29 December 2016 to 7 January 2017.
Giesen Park in Renwick  will host the main camp site with four other activity hubs in Picton, Blenheim, Omaka and in Pine Valley.
As in almost all Jamborees, the event is divided into a number of sub-camps and attending Scout troops are allocated to a specific sub-camp. Each sub-camp has its own administration and support, provided by volunteers.
The event has been welcomed locally with the 4500 participants expected to bring an economic boost to the area.
Special transport arrangements have been put in place to get all the Scouts and supporters to and from the site.

Staff 
Jamborees provide opportunities for both adults and young people to  work as volunteer members of staff (often called the "support team" to  provide a number of services to the Jamboree. Staff members arrive a number of days before the jamboree begins and usually depart on the same day or a few days later to set up the site so that it is ready for the scouts to arrive on opening day.

Youth Staff Team  
The Youth Staff team (YST) is a group of about 150 people aged from Yr 12 (in 2016) to 26 years old.  These volunteers come from Venturer groups all over the country and some may be from overseas. YST’s role is to give service and a chance to give back to Scouting.

20th New Zealand Scout Jamboree 

The 20th New Zealand Scout Jamboree (also known as NZ20 or MPWR) was held at Manfeild Park, Feilding, New Zealand between 28 December 2013 and 6 January 2014.

Manfeild Park, near Feilding, was the main venue for the Jamboree. Some activities were held outside Feilding - for example, the caving base was held on a farm north of Pohangina, near Ashhurst. On the final day of activities, the full-day water-based "Water'M" activity was cancelled and the Scouts scheduled to attend were taken to the Lido Aquatic Centre in Palmerston North for the afternoon.

The 20th New Zealand Scout Jamboree was attended by over 3,000 Scouts and Leaders from New Zealand, Australia, Samoa, the Cook Islands, Indonesia, South Korea, and several other countries.

The theme of NZ20 was 'MPWR' - the empowerment of patrols to be independent and responsible scouts at the Jamboree.

The patrol leaders were given more responsibility than at the previous Jamboree and had to manage their own timetable and their patrol without an adult leader with them.

The Jamboree was split into three sub camps: MBLZN (yellow), MBRK (blue) and MBLDN (red). Each subcamp had a subcamp office that was responsible for running the subcamp.

On 1 January 2014 the Jamboree set a Guinness World Record for the most people wearing paper hats at a single venue (3054, breaking the previous record of 1155).

19th New Zealand Scout Jamboree 

The 19th New Zealand Scout Jamboree (known as Adventure Jam 2011) was held at Mystery Creek Events Centre, Hamilton, New Zealand between 29 December 2010 and 6 January 2011. Mystery Creek Events Centre, near Hamilton, was the main venue for the Jamboree. Some activities were held outside Mystery Creek.

Adventure Jam 2011 was attended by over 4,000 Scouts from all over New Zealand, Australia, Samoa, Cook Islands, New Caledonia and other countries.

The camps were split into 3 subcamps: Xtreme (red), Xcite (blue) and Xplore (green).

FuseAir 107.6 FM was the Jamboree's official radio station.

The 18th New Zealand Scout Jamboree 
The 18th New Zealand Scout Jamboree (known as C-JAM) was held in Christchurch, New Zealand between December 2007 and January 2008.

References

External links
Scouts New Zealand Jamboree Website
SCOUTS New Zealand (scouts.org.nz)
Official Jamboree Facebook Page

Scouting jamborees
Scouting and Guiding in New Zealand